A tippet is a piece of clothing worn over the shoulders in the shape of a scarf or cape. Tippets evolved in the fourteenth century from long sleeves and typically had one end hanging down to the knees. A tippet (or tappit) could also be the long, narrow, streamer-like strips of fabric worn as an armband just above the elbow, that hung gracefully to the knee or even the ground. In later fashion, a tippet is often any scarf-like wrap, usually made of fur, such as the sixteenth-century zibellino or the fur-lined capelets worn in the mid-18th century.

Ecclesiastical use

Anglican
The ceremonial scarf often worn by Anglican priests, deacons, and lay readers is called a tippet, also known as a "preaching scarf". It is worn with choir dress and hangs straight down at the front. Ordained clergy (bishops, priests and deacons) wear a black tippet. In the last century or so variations have arisen to accommodate forms of lay leadership. Authorized readers (known in some dioceses as licensed lay ministers) sometimes wear a blue one. A red tippet is also worn in some Anglican dioceses by commissioned lay workers. Commissioned evangelists of the Church Army are presented with a cherry red type tippet of the capelet or collar shape rather than a scarf, although some replace this with a scarf form of the tippet, retaining the distinctive red colour.

Tippets are often worn as part of choir dress for the Daily Offices of Morning Prayer and Evening Prayer, as required in Canon B8 of the Church of England (in the Canon, the word "scarf" is used). Stricter low church clergy may wear the tippet, and not a coloured stole, as part of choir dress during any church service, including for the Holy Communion. This follows practice that was normalized from the Reformation until the late 19th century. By contrast, some Anglo-Catholics tend not to wear the tippet, preferring to wear the choir habit of Roman Catholic clergy which does not include it.

Clergy who are entitled to wear medals, orders, or awards sometimes fix them to the upper left side of the tippet on suitable occasions (such as Remembrance Sunday in the Church of England). Sometimes the end of the tippet is embroidered with the coat of arms of an ecclesiastical institution with which the cleric is affiliated. It is common for the Canons of Cathedral churches to have the coat of arms of their cathedral embroidered on one or both sides of the tippet, commonly on the breast rather than the end, as a sign of office. 

The tippet is not the stole, which although often worn like a scarf, is a Eucharistic vestment, usually made of richer material, and varying according to the liturgical colour of the day.

Other denominations
In the British Army, all serving chaplains are issued with a tippet to be worn directly over battledress when ministering in conflict zones. Anglican chaplains wear the standard black tippet, whilst Roman Catholic chaplains are distinguished by a violet coloured tippet.

Some Lutherans also use the tippet. Members of the Lutheran Society of the Holy Trinity wear a black tippet embroidered with the Society's seal when presiding at the daily office.

The black preaching scarf (or rarely blue, grey, or green) is also worn by some Scottish Presbyterian ministers and other non-conformist clergy.

British military nurses
A different and non-religious sort of tippet, a shoulder-length cape, has been part of the uniform of British military nurses or of nursing uniforms in Commonwealth countries.  These are often decorated with piping and may have badges or insignia indicating the wearer's rank.

Evolution of the tippet

Notes

References
Arnold, Janet:  Queen Elizabeth's Wardrobe Unlock'd, W S Maney and Son Ltd, Leeds 1988. 
Netherton, Robin, "The Tippet: Accessory after Fact?", in Robin Netherton and Gale R. Owen-Crocker, editors, Medieval Clothing and Textiles, Volume 1, Woodbridge, Suffolk, UK, and Rochester, NY, the Boydell Press, 2005, 
 Payne, Blanche: History of Costume from the Ancient Egyptians to the Twentieth Century, Harper & Row, 1965. No ISBN for this edition; ASIN B0006BMNFS
Dickinson, Emily, "My Tippet - only Tulle -", in Because I could not stop for Death, Poems, Robert Brothers of Boston, 1890

Scarves
Shawls and wraps
Anglican vestments
History of clothing
Fur